Oldenlandia adscensionis was a species of plant in the family Rubiaceae. It was endemic to Ascension Island. It became extinct due to habitat loss.

References

adscensionis
Flora of Ascension Island
Extinct plants
Extinct biota of Africa
Plant extinctions since 1500
Taxonomy articles created by Polbot